Gulucun Cable Car is a aerial tramway connecting the two mountain villages of Gulu and Maping deep within the Dadu River Canyon in Hanyuan, Sichuan, China. The 720 meter span crosses 400 meters above Laochang Creek, one of 4 large tributaries on the north side of the Dadu River Canyon.

A local 2-lane road on the Gulu side allows access to the west station while the east station can only be reached via a steep trail that rises more than 500 meters from the Dadu River level to the village of Maping.  Prior to the completion of the cable car in 2017, villagers used a simple ropeway with a small steel cage to transfer animals and other cargo goods across the Laochang gorge.  For 2019 there are plans to open the Gulucun Cable Car to tourists.

The east Maping station is 40 meters higher in elevation then the west station.  The tramway car reaches a height of 400 meters above the creek making it the second highest passenger tramway in the world along with the Kitzbühel 3S Cable Car in Austria and just behind the 436 meter high Peak 2 Peak Gondola in Whistler, British Columbia, Canada.  The nearby Dadu River elevation is 480 meters below the cable car elevation.

The mouth of the Laochang creek is crossed by the famous Yixiantian stone railway bridge.

Gallery

References

 Sohu Webpage on Gulucun Tramway
 Sohu Webpage on Gulucun Tramway
 Sichuan news story on Gulucun Tramway Completion
 China News Gulucun Tramway story

Transport in China
aerial tramways